The  was an infantry division of the Imperial Japanese Army. It was formed 2 April 1945 in Sendai as a triangular division. It was one of the batch of eight divisions comprising 201st, 202nd, 205th, 206th, 209th, 212th, 214th and 216th divisions created as part of the Japanese reaction on the Battle of Okinawa.

Action
The 202nd division was assigned as the mobile reserve of the Kantō region. The 504th infantry regiment was garrisoning Isesaki, 505th - Annaka, and 506th infantry regiment - Honjō. Other sub-units were deployed at Numata. The 202nd division did not see any combat.

See also
 List of Japanese Infantry Divisions

Notes and references
This article incorporates material from Japanese Wikipedia page 第202師団 (日本軍), accessed 14 July 2016
 Madej, W. Victor, Japanese Armed Forces Order of Battle, 1937–1945 [2 vols], Allentown, PA: 1981.

Japanese World War II divisions
Infantry divisions of Japan
Military units and formations established in 1945
Military units and formations disestablished in 1945
1945 establishments in Japan
1945 disestablishments in Japan